German submarine U-528 was a Type IXC U-boat of Nazi Germany's Kriegsmarine during World War II.

She was laid down at the Deutsche Werft (yard) in Hamburg as yard number 343 on 10 November 1941, launched on 1 July 1942 and commissioned on 16 September with Kapitänleutnant Karl-Heinz Fuchs in command.

U-528 began her service career with training as part of the 4th U-boat Flotilla from 16 September 1942. She was reassigned to the 10th flotilla for operations on 1 April 1943.

She carried out one patrol but did not sink any ships. She was a member of one wolfpack.

She was sunk by a British aircraft and a British warship southwest of Ireland on 11 May 1943.

Design
German Type IXC/40 submarines were slightly larger than the original Type IXCs. U-528 had a displacement of  when at the surface and  while submerged. She had two shafts and two  propellers.

U-528 was fitted with six  torpedo tubes (four fitted at the bow and two at the stern), 22 torpedoes, one  SK C/32 naval gun, 180 rounds, and a  SK C/30 as well as a  C/30 anti-aircraft gun. The boat had a complement of forty-eight.

Service history

Patrol and loss
The boat departed Kiel on 15 April 1943, moved through the North Sea, negotiated the gap between Iceland and the Faroe Islands and entered the Atlantic Ocean. There, she was intercepted by the escorts of Convoy ON (S) 5 and damaged. She was sunk on her way to the French Atlantic bases.

U-528 was 'destroyed' on 11 May 1943 southwest of Ireland by depth charges dropped from a Handley Page Halifax of No. 58 Squadron RAF and the British sloop .

Eleven men went down with the U-boat; there were 45 survivors. Among the survivors was Reimar Lüst who later became an astrophysicist.

Wolfpacks
U-528 took part in one wolfpack, namely:
 Star (27 April – 4 May 1943)

References

Bibliography

External links

German Type IX submarines
U-boats commissioned in 1942
U-boats sunk in 1943
World War II submarines of Germany
1942 ships
World War II shipwrecks in the Atlantic Ocean
Ships built in Hamburg
U-boats sunk by British aircraft
U-boats sunk by depth charges
U-boats sunk by British warships
Maritime incidents in May 1943